Kyösti Karhila (May 2, 1921 – September 16, 2009) was a Finnish World War II fighter ace with 32¼ victories. He was born in Rauma, Finland. He began flying in Lentolaivue 32 and flew later in LeLv 30, LeLv 32, LeLv 34 and LeLv 24. He scored 13¼ of his victories with P-36 Hawks and 19 with Bf 109s.

Biography
After the war broke out on the 30 November 1939, Karhila was drafted and posted to Kauhava Air Base for training. On completion of training he was then posted to LeLv 24 at Siikakangas, equipped with the Fokker D.XXI. He was then posted to LeLv 30 on 20 June 1941. In mid-July the unit was re-equipped with the Curtiss P-36 Hawk. Karhila's first air combat was on 31 July 1941, against two Soviet Air Force I-153's. 

Karhila transferred to LeLv 34 based at Utti in March 1943, flying the Bf 109G-2. In March 1944 his flight was posted piecemeal into LeLv 30 at Malmi to defend Helsinki, although after the Soviet ground offensive commenced in June 1944 the flight returned to LeLv 34.

After his air force career he flew airliners for Finnair, Aero O/Y and Spearair. He gathered 556 flying hours during the war (in 304 combat sorties) and 24,000 after the war. He died in Helsinki at the age of 88 as the last of the Finnish fighter aces. F18 Hornet of the Finnish Air Force performed a flypast over the city during the ceremony.

Aerial victories

References

External links
Interview with Kyösti Karhila
Kyosti Karhila in Dogfight Over Gulf of Finland
Obituary, Helsingin Sanomat
Interview in Finnish
 List of World War II aces from Finland

1921 births
2009 deaths
People from Rauma, Finland
Finnish World War II flying aces
Finnish Air Force personnel